Leah Robinson may refer:

 Leah Robinson (soccer), Canadian soccer player
 Leah Robinson (athlete), Canadian paralympic sprinter